Bomberman Max 2 is a video game released for the Game Boy Advance on 30 May 2002 in North America. The game was preceded by Bomberman Max which was released for the Game Boy Color on May 14, 2000. As with Bomberman Max, there are two versions of Bomberman Max 2: Blue Advance and Red Advance. As in the first, in Blue Advance the playable character is Bomberman and in Red Advance the playable character is Max.

Story
Bomberman and Max have been shrunk by the evil Mujoe's Mini-Mini Device. They must take revenge on him and his Hige Hige Bandits, and hopefully return to their normal size.

Gameplay
The gameplay is similar to most Bomberman games, where Bomberman and Max lay down bombs to destroy enemies, blocks, etc. Unlike past Bomberman games, however, there is a lack of the classic multiplayer, instead featuring a more Pokémon-like game. In this game, there are many monsters that Bomberman and Max can acquire and use to their advantage.

Both games are more or less the same, although they both have some extra levels and different Charaboms.

Reception

References

External links
Official page at Hudson Soft's Japan Website
Majesco Bomberman Max 2: Blue Advance Bomberman Max 2: Red Advance

2002 video games
Max 2
Game Boy Advance games
Game Boy Advance-only games
Multiplayer and single-player video games
Video games developed in Japan
Video games about size change
Video games with alternative versions

Hudson Soft games
Action video games
Majesco Entertainment games